Evan Jolitz (born July 26, 1951) is a former American football linebacker. He played for the Cincinnati Bengals in 1974.

References

1951 births
Living people
American football linebackers
Xavier Musketeers football players
Cincinnati Bearcats football players
Cincinnati Bengals players
Calgary Stampeders players